Różyce may refer to:

Różyce, Łowicz County
Różyce, Zgierz County
Różyce Żmijowe
Różyce-Żurawieniec